Ashlie Crofts (born 24 April 1998) is a midfielder who plays for Western Sydney Wanderers in the A-League Women. She has previously played for Canberra United in the W-League.

Club career
In addition to her soccer career she played futsal which she credits with helping her technical game.

In 2015 she began her senior career with Marconi Stallions, before moving to the Blacktown Spartans in the National Premier Leagues NSW where she came third in the golden boot with 16 goals.

Crofts was recruited by Canberra United for the 2019–20 W-League season. At the time she had thought the chance to play in the W-league had passed her by, but got a call from the coach Heather Garriock to join the team after seeing her perform in the NPL.

Crofts was a substitute in Canberra United's first match of the season, and got her first start in a match in the third round against Newcastle Jets where she scored her first goal in a 3–2 victory. This was Canberra United's first victory in 741 days.

In October 2021, Crofts joined her local club Western Sydney Wanderers for the 2021–22 A-League Women season.

Honours 
 Individual
 National Premier Leagues NSW Women's Reserves Golden Boot: 2017 (15 goals)

References 

Canberra United FC players
Western Sydney Wanderers FC (A-League Women) players
1998 births
Living people
Australian women's soccer players
Women's association football midfielders